Alfons Henri "Rik" Larnoe (18 May 1897 – 24 February 1978) was a Belgian football (soccer) player who competed in the 1920 Summer Olympics. He was a member of the Belgium team, which won the gold medal in the football tournament.

References

External links 
 Henri Larnoe's profile at databaseOlympics
 
 

1897 births
1978 deaths
Belgian footballers
Footballers at the 1920 Summer Olympics
Footballers at the 1924 Summer Olympics
Olympic footballers of Belgium
Olympic gold medalists for Belgium
Belgium international footballers
Olympic medalists in football
Medalists at the 1920 Summer Olympics
Association football midfielders
20th-century Belgian people